This is a glossary of historical Romanian taxes used in the principalities of Moldavia and Wallachia.

References

Romania history-related lists
Romanian language
Economic history of Romania
History of Wallachia
History of Moldavia